Phycita pedisignella is a species of snout moth described by Émile Louis Ragonot in 1887. It is found in  Greece, North Macedonia and Turkey.

The wingspan is about 25 mm.

References

Moths described in 1887
Phycitini
Moths of Europe
Moths of Asia